Rhodium(III) bromide refers to inorganic compounds of the formula RhBr3(H2O)n where  n = 0 or approximately three.  Both forms are brown solids.  The hydrate is soluble in water and lower alcohols.  It is used to prepare rhodium bromide complexes. Rhodium bromides are similar to the chlorides, but have attracted little academic or commercial attention.

Structure 
Rhodium(III) bromide adopts the aluminium chloride crystal structure.

Reactions 
Rhodium(III) bromide is a starting material for the synthesis of other rhodium halides. For example, it reacts with bromine trifluoride to form rhodium(IV) fluoride and with aqueous potassium iodide to form rhodium(III) fluoride. Like most other rhodium trihalides, anhydrous RhBr3 is insoluble in water. The dihydrate RhBr3·2H2O forms when rhodium metal reacts with hydrochloric acid and bromine.

References

Rhodium(III) compounds
Bromides
Platinum group halides